Zamana is a 1985 Indian Hindi-language film, directed by Ramesh Talwar, it stars Rajesh Khanna, Rishi Kapoor, Poonam Dhillon, Ranjeeta, along with Kulbhushan Kharbanda, Om Puri, Girish Karnad, Avtar Gill, Mac Mohan, Satyendra Kapoor form the supporting cast.

This film took about 6 years to get completed. Director Ramesh Talwar started this film after Doosra Aadmi. 

This film was the last work of Salim-Javed together. The film was critically acclaimed and was a Golden jubilee hit upon its release.

Synopsis
The story is about the misunderstandings that develop between the brothers Inspector Vinod Kumar (Rajesh Khanna) and Ravi Kumar (Rishi Kapoor). Their father Satish, a photographer, was murdered when Vinod was 3 years old and his mother Sudha was pregnant with Ravi. When the children grow up, Vinod becomes a police inspector and Ravi becomes a criminal working for a don named J.D. The men fall in love with the same woman, but are reconciled, and Vinod finds his father's killers and convinces his younger brother to leave the world of crime.

Cast
Rajesh Khanna as Inspector Vinod Kumar
Rishi Kapoor as Ravi Kumar
Poonam Dhillon as Sheetal
Ranjeeta as Geeta
Kulbhushan Kharbanda as Jogeshwar Dayal "J.D."
Om Puri as Shyam
Girish Karnad as Satish Kumar
Ashalata Wabgaonkar as Sudha
 Gopi Krishna as Latturam
 Mohan Sherry as Sher Singh
 Mac Mohan as Balwant
 Sharat Saxena as Ratan
 Gurbachan Singh as Raghu
 Yunus Parvez as train passenger who helps Sudha
 Avtar Gill as Police Inspector
 Maqsood as Sudhir
 Piloo Wadia as Mrs. Batliwala
 Satyendra Kapoor as Sheetal's father
 Shamsuddin as Villain

Soundtrack

Trivia
 The film is shot in Pune and Mumbai, Juhu Versova area.

 The plot involves a photo in which the photographer unknowingly captures a murder being committed. Another classic movie Jaane Bhi Do Yaaro was also based on similar plot but was made entirely different.

 In this movie, Rishi Kapoor is shown as a car mechanic. He played same role in Jhoota Kahin Ka (1979) movie.

References

External links
 

1985 films
Indian buddy films
Indian action drama films
1980s Hindi-language films
Films scored by Usha Khanna
Films with screenplays by Salim–Javed
1980s Urdu-language films
1980s action drama films
Hindi-language action films
Films directed by Ramesh Talwar
Urdu-language Indian films